Agalma elegans is a species of siphonophores in the family Agalmatidae. It has been found in a wide variety of locations, including between the Reloncavi Fjord and the Boca del Guafo Passage, in the Chiloe Inland Sea (CIS), Chile.

References 

 Development and metamorphosis of the larva of Agalma elegans (Sars)(Siphonophora Physonectae). AK Totton, Pap Mar Biol Oceanogr, 1956

External links 
 

 Agalma elegans at WoRMS

Agalmatidae
Taxa named by Michael Sars
Animals described in 1846